A. solaris may refer to:

 Asterodothis solaris, a fungus species
 Attus solaris, a synonym for Attulus helveolus, a jumping spider species found in Europe

See also
 Solaris (disambiguation)